Supervivientes 2023: Perdidos en Honduras is the eighteenth season of the show Supervivientes and the twenty-second season of Survivor to air in Spain and it started to be broadcast on 2 March 2023. Live galas are happening every thursday in prime time, while debates happend in Sundays.

Changes

After eight years serving as the "in location" host in Honduras, Lara Álvarez announced her departure from the show, citing her wish to embrace new working projects. That same day, Mediaset announced weathergirl Laura Madrueño as her replacement. Jorge Javier Vázquez returned as the main host from the studios, while Carlos Sobera and Ion Aramendi continue to host the side shows and the debates respectively.

It was also announced that this will be the last season of Bulldog TV producing the show, as the disagreements between the broadcaster and the owner of the rights, French company Banijay Group, has forced Mediaset to award the productions rights from 2024 on to Cuarzo, a fillial of the French group, in orther to preserve the product.

Cast

The contestants were announced by the network. They where divided even before leaving Madrid, with five contestants being "left out" of the group in Tierra de Nadie. The rest where divided in two tribes via a challenge in the shows premiere.

Weekly statistics

Nominations

Tribes

References

Survivor Spain seasons